Uncle Tom syndrome is a theory in multicultural psychology referring to a coping skill in which individuals use passivity and submissiveness when confronted with a threat, leading to subservient behaviour and appeasement, while concealing their true thoughts and feelings.

Overview
The term "Uncle Tom" comes from the title character of Harriet Beecher Stowe's novel Uncle Tom's Cabin, where an enslaved African American, Tom, is beaten to death for refusing to betray the whereabouts of two other enslaved people. In Stowe's novel Uncle Tom is a heroic character, loyal to the slaves in hiding, but the original producers of the stage version of the story "grossly distorted" the character into a man who would sell out his own race to curry favor with white people. This version of Uncle Tom was designed to be more favourable to audiences of the late 1850's and it is he, not the original, that the slur refers to.

In the American racial context, "Uncle Tom" is a pejorative term for African Americans who give up or hide their ethnic outlook, traits, and practices, in order to be accepted into the mainstream.

In race studies literature, Uncle Tom syndrome refers to African Americans that, as a necessary survival technique, opt to appear docile, non-assertive, and happy-go-lucky.  Especially during slavery, African Americans used passivity and servility for the avoidance of retaliation and for self-preservation.

In a broader context, the term may refer to a minority's strategy of coping with oppression from socially, culturally, or economically dominant groups involving suppression of aggressive feelings and even identification with the oppressor, leading to forced assimilation/acculturation of the cultural minority.

See also

 Ad hominem
 Anti-Semite and Jew
 Association of German National Jews
 Black Legend of the Spanish Inquisition
 Boba liberal
 Hanjian
 Patrol 36
 Neturei Karta
 No true Scotsman
 Race traitor
 Satmar
 Self-hating Catholic
 Takfir
 The Believer
 White guilt

References

Human behavior
Psychological adjustment
Stereotypes of African Americans
Syndrome
Behavioural syndromes associated with physiological disturbances and physical factors
Culture-bound syndromes
Majority–minority relations